The Hiram Bell Farmstead was built by Hiram Bell in 1850. It is located in Fairfield Township, Columbiana County, Ohio.  The house and adjoining buildings were added to the National Register of Historic Places as a historic district in 1999.

In 1877, Bell was elected to a three-year term as a Columbiana County commissioner. By this time, he had built himself a reputation as a prosperous businessman. Beside his farm, Bell supported his family via a simple industrial facility: throughout the 1860s and 1870s, he owned a steam sawmill in Elkrun Township.

References

Houses on the National Register of Historic Places in Ohio
Greek Revival houses in Ohio
Italianate architecture in Ohio
Houses completed in 1850
Houses in Columbiana County, Ohio
National Register of Historic Places in Columbiana County, Ohio
Historic districts on the National Register of Historic Places in Ohio